James T. Linnemann from Michigan State University, was awarded the status of Fellow in the American Physical Society, after he was nominated by the Division of Particles and Fields in 2009, for original research in high energy physics and particle astrophysics through electronics and software applications, seminal contributions to the discoveries of the top quark and TeV gamma-ray sources, searches for supersymmetry, and applications of statistics.

References 

Fellows of the American Physical Society
American physicists
Living people
Year of birth missing (living people)